This is a list of listed buildings in Sheffield City Centre, covering the S1 postcode district in the City of Sheffield, South Yorkshire, England.  The district contains 137 listed buildings that are recorded in the National Heritage List for England.  Of these, two are listed at Grade I, the highest of the three grades, 12 are at Grade II*, the middle grade, and the others are at Grade II, the lowest grade.

For other areas inside the Sheffield Inner Ring Road which are sometimes regarded as part of the city centre, see listed buildings in S2, listed buildings in S3, listed buildings in S4 and listed buildings in S10.



Key

Buildings

References 

 - A list of all the listed buildings within Sheffield City Council's boundary is available to download from this page.

Sources

 
Sheffield